Monteviale is a town and comune in the province of Vicenza, Veneto, northern Italy.

Sources

Cities and towns in Veneto